Diego Garrido Garcia (born 20 June 1984), commonly known as Diego Garrido, is a Spanish professional football player who is currently playing for Tercera División club Somozas.

References

External links
 
 
 
 Diego Garrido at HKFA

Living people
1984 births
Spanish footballers
Footballers from Cantabria
Association football defenders
Segunda División B players
Tercera División players
Rayo Cantabria players
Racing de Ferrol footballers
UB Conquense footballers
CD Lugo players
Cádiz CF players
Orihuela CF players
UD Logroñés players
La Roda CF players
UD Somozas players
Hong Kong Premier League players
Southern District FC players
Spanish expatriate footballers
Expatriate footballers in Hong Kong
Spanish expatriate sportspeople in Hong Kong